Sigvard Kinnunen (11 April 1920 – 5 April 1954) was a Swedish weightlifter. He competed at the 1948 Summer Olympics and the 1952 Summer Olympics.

References

External links
 

1920 births
1954 deaths
Swedish male weightlifters
Olympic weightlifters of Sweden
Weightlifters at the 1948 Summer Olympics
Weightlifters at the 1952 Summer Olympics
People from Kiruna Municipality
Sportspeople from Norrbotten County
20th-century Swedish people